The New York Yankees are a Major League Baseball (MLB) franchise based in The Bronx, New York. They play in the American League East division. Since the institution of Major League Baseball's Rule 4 Draft, the Yankees have selected 46 players in the first round. Officially known as the "First-Year Player Draft", the Rule 4 Draft is Major League Baseball's primary mechanism for assigning amateur baseball players from high schools, colleges, and other amateur baseball clubs to its teams. The draft order is determined based on the previous season's standings, with the team possessing the worst record receiving the first pick. In addition, teams which lost free agents in the previous off-season may be awarded compensatory or supplementary picks.

Of the 48 players the Yankees have selected in the first round, 23 were pitchers. Of these, 18 were right-handed and 5 were left-handed. The Yankees have drafted ten outfielders, six shortstops, three catchers, three first basemen, and three third basemen. The team has never drafted a player at second base. The Yankees drafted 29 players out of high school, and drafted 18 players out of college. Eleven of the players came from high schools or colleges in the state of California, and Florida follows with five players.

Four first-round picks have won championships with the franchise: Thurman Munson (1977 and 1978), Derek Jeter (1996, 1998, 1999, 2000 and 2009), Phil Hughes (2009), and Joba Chamberlain (2009). Munson and Jeter have both also served as team captains for the Yankees. Derek Jeter is the only one of the Yankees' first-round picks to have been elected to the Baseball Hall of Fame. Two of the Yankees' picks have won the MLB Rookie of the Year award; Munson won the award in 1970, and Jeter won the award in 1996.

The Yankees have made 11 selections in the supplemental round of the draft and 19 compensatory picks since the institution of the First-Year Player Draft in 1965. These additional picks are provided when a team loses a particularly valuable free agent in the previous off-season, or, more recently, if a team fails to sign a draft pick from the previous year. The Yankees have been awarded compensatory draft choices for failing to sign first round picks Tyrell Godwin (1997) and Gerrit Cole (2008). Though the Yankees also failed to sign Mark Prior (1998), they were not awarded a compensatory pick, as Prior was chosen with the pick received for Godwin, and compensatory rules only allow for one compensation pick for failing to sign a player. The Yankees have also surrendered 10 first round picks due to free agent signings.

Key

Picks

Footnotes
 Through the 2012 draft, free agents were evaluated by the Elias Sports Bureau and rated "Type A", "Type B", or not compensation-eligible. If a team offered arbitration to a player but that player refused and subsequently signed with another team, the original team was able to receive additional draft picks. If a "Type A" free agent left in this way, his previous team received a supplemental pick and a compensatory pick from the team with which he signed. If a "Type B" free agent left in this way, his previous team received only a supplemental pick. Since the 2013 draft, free agents are no longer classified by type; instead, compensatory picks are only awarded if the team offered its free agent a contract worth at least the average of the 125 current richest MLB contracts. However, if the free agent's last team acquired the player in a trade during the last year of his contract, it is ineligible to receive compensatory picks for that player.
The Yankees gained a compensatory first round pick in the 1978 draft from the Chicago White Sox for the loss of free agent Ron Blomberg.
The Yankees gained a compensatory first round pick in the 1978 draft from the Boston Red Sox for the loss of free agent Mike Torrez.
The Yankees lost their first round pick in the 1979 draft to the Los Angeles Dodgers as compensation for signing free agent Tommy John.
The Yankees lost their first round pick in the 1980 draft to the Montreal Expos as compensation for signing free agent Rudy May.
The Yankees lost their first round pick in the 1981 draft to the San Diego Padres as compensation for signing free agent Dave Winfield.
The Yankees lost their first round pick in the 1982 draft to the Cincinnati Reds as compensation for signing free agent Dave Collins.
The Yankees lost their first round pick in the 1983 draft to the Chicago White Sox as compensation for signing free agent Steve Kemp.
The Yankees gained a compensatory first round pick in the 1985 draft for losing Tim Belcher in the 1984 compensation draft. The Yankees lost their first round pick to the San Diego Padres as compensation for signing free agent Ed Whitson.
The Yankees lost their first round pick in the 1986 draft to the California Angels as compensation for signing free agent Al Holland.
The Yankees lost their first round pick in the 1987 draft to the Texas Rangers as compensation for signing free agent Gary Ward.
The Yankees lost their first round pick in the 1988 draft to the St. Louis Cardinals as compensation for signing free agent Jack Clark.
The Yankees lost their first round pick in the 1989 draft to the Los Angeles Dodgers as compensation for signing free agent Steve Sax.
The Yankees gained a compensatory first round pick in the 1996 draft from the Anaheim Angels for the loss of free agent Randy Velarde. The Yankees lost their first round pick to the Texas Rangers as compensation for signing free agent Kenny Rogers.
The Yankees gained a compensatory first round pick in the 1997 draft from the Texas Rangers for the loss of free agent John Wetteland. The Yankees lost their first round pick to the Baltimore Orioles as compensation for signing free agent David Wells.
The Yankees gained a supplemental first round pick in the 1997 draft for the loss of free agent John Wetteland.
The Yankees gained a compensatory first round pick in the 1998 draft for failing to sign 1997 first round pick Tyrell Godwin.
The Yankees gained a compensatory first round pick in the 1998 draft from the Seattle Mariners for losing free agent Jeff Nelson.
The Yankees gained a supplemental first round pick in the 1998 draft for losing free agent Denny Neagle.
The Yankees gained a supplemental first round pick in the 1998 draft for losing free agent Jeff Nelson. The Yankees lost their first round pick to the Baltimore Orioles as compensation for signing free agent Mike Mussina.
The Yankees lost their first round pick in the 2002 draft to the Oakland Athletics as compensation for signing free agent Jason Giambi.
The Yankees gained a compensatory first round pick in the 2004 draft from the Houston Astros for losing free agent Andy Pettitte.
The Yankees gained a supplemental first round pick in the 2004 draft as compensation for losing free agent Andy Pettitte. The Yankees lost their first round pick to the Los Angeles Dodgers as compensation for signing free agent Paul Quantrill.
The Yankees gained a supplemental first round pick in the 2004 draft for losing free agent David Wells.
The Yankees gained a compensatory first round pick in the 2006 draft from the Philadelphia Phillies for losing free agent Tom Gordon. The Yankees lost their first round pick to the Boston Red Sox as compensation for signing free agent Johnny Damon.
The Yankees gained a supplemental first round pick in the 2006 draft as compensation for losing free agent Tom Gordon.
The Yankees gained a supplemental first round pick in the 2008 draft as compensation for losing free agent Luis Vizcaíno.
The Yankees gained a compensatory first round pick in the 2009 draft for failing to sign 2008 first round pick Gerrit Cole. The Yankees lost their first round pick to the Los Angeles Angels of Anaheim as compensation for signing free agent Mark Teixeira.
The Yankees gained a compensatory first round pick in the 2011 draft as compensation for losing free agent Javier Vázquez. The Yankees lost their first round pick to the Tampa Bay Rays as compensation for signing free agent Rafael Soriano.

See also

New York Yankees minor league players

References
General references

In-text citations

First-round
New York Yankees